Elections for the Midlothian District Council took place in 1974, alongside elections to the councils of Scotland's various other districts. These were the first election to the Midlothian District Council, and saw Labour winning 11 of the Councils 15 seats.

Aggregate results

Ward results

References

1974 Scottish local elections
1974